Judd Tilyard (born 15 August 1978) is an Australian film director and producer,  based in Toronto since 2010 where he is the co-owner and head of Production at Dimeworth Films.

Best known for his ongoing cult success as both a director and producer, Tilyard has been working with James O'Barr to develop an adaptation of the Frame 137 comic created by James O'Barr.

Professional career 
Tilyard received a scholarship to the Queensland School of Film and Television graduating in 1996 his final year film Hot Crusty Death, the story of two rival pizza delivering Ninjas, gained underground success winning numerous awards and screening in over 20 international festivals.

Tilyard went on to direct several other acclaimed and award winning films such as Whaleboat, Sniffer, and Faithless establishing DarcStorm Productions in 2001, under which he produced and directed music videos and live visuals for various major labels and artists including the acclaimed video 'Sculptor of flesh' for Norwegian metal band "1349" and displays for Gatecrasher and Roger Sanchez.

In 2008 he produced the action horror feature film Sleeper, starring former WWE champion Raven before joining Dimeworth Films  and relocating to Canada in 2010. Tilyard went on to produce Battleground with Ayz Waraich, the 80's-style cult action film was released internationally in 2011 and is scheduled for release in North America in 2012.

Filmography

Feature Film 
 Battleground (2011) Producer 
 Sleeper (2009 film) Producer

Short Film 
 Tubes (2008) Co-Producer 
 The Walk (2007) Director
 The Kangaroo (2006) Director 
 Goodbyes (2006) Writer/Director/Producer
 Leonard Wants to Kill Himself (2006) Co-Writer/Co-Director/Co-Producer
 Roadkill (2005) Producer
 Little Witches (2005) Producer
 Faithless (2004) Director 
 Painter (2004) Producer
 Method School (2004) Producer
 Sniffer (2003) Director 
 Pests (2003) Producer
 The Machine (2002) Producer 
 Version of Events (2000) Producer 
 Whaleboat (2000) Director 
 Hot Crusty Death (1997) Director/Producer

External links 
Official Site: www.dimeworth.com 
 Vimeo
 Youtube
 Twitter

References 

1978 births
Living people
Australian music video directors
Australian film directors
Australian film producers
Film producers from Ontario
Queensland School of Film and Television alumni
People from Brisbane
Australian emigrants to Canada